Tariff Act can refer to the following:

United States
Hamilton tariff (1789)
Morrill Tariff (1861)
Tariff of 1883
McKinley Tariff (1890)
Wilson–Gorman Tariff Act (1894)
Dingley Act (1897)
Payne–Aldrich Tariff Act (1909)
Revenue Act of 1913
Fordney–McCumber Tariff (1922)
Smoot–Hawley Tariff Act (1930)
Reciprocal Tariff Act (1934)
Trade and Tariff Act of 1984

Other countries
Isle of Man (Customs) Acts (1874)

See also
List of tariffs in the United States